Dmitry Ulyanov or Dmitri Ulyanov  may refer to:

 Dmitry Ilyich Ulyanov (1874–1943), Soviet politician, brother of Vladimir Lenin
 Dmitry Nikolayevich Ulyanov (born 1970), Russian footballer who had success playing in Israel
 Dmitry Ulyanov (alpine skier) (born 1983), Russian former alpine skier